Blue Mountain is a rural locality in the Isaac Region, Queensland, Australia.

History 
Blue Mountain Provisional School opened in July 1943. In 1958 it became Blue Mountain State School.  The school closed in 1963.

Road infrastructure
The Peak Downs Highway runs through the north-western extremity.

References 

Isaac Region
Localities in Queensland